Liane Engeman (born 24 March 1947) is a Dutch former racing car driver born in Haarlem, Netherlands. Having worked for her father's taxi company in Zandvoort, she could already drive at 15 years old. She was introduced to racing by chance when rally driver Rob Slotemaker offered her a lift while she waited at a bus stop. In 1965 she started racing professionally at Formula Vee in the Netherlands. She then went on to compete in the 1969 British Saloon Car Championship for D.J. Bond Racing, driving a Ford Anglia.

Racing record

Complete British Saloon Car Championship results
(key) (Races in bold indicate pole position; races in italics indicate fastest lap.)

† Events with 2 races staged for the different classes.

^ Race with 2 heats - Aggregate result.

References

External links

Living people
Dutch racing drivers
British Touring Car Championship drivers
1947 births